Koteshwar Mahadev Temple (Devanagari: कोटेश्वर महादेव) is a Hindu temple dedicated to Shiva, and is located approximately  from the centre of the Rudraprayag district of Uttarakhand, a little above the Alaknanda River.

Legends 
The location is presumed to be the spot where Lord Shiva had stopped for meditation on his way to Kedarnath. According to local mythology the temple has existed since the time of Bhasmasura.

This was the demon who turned to ashes anyone whose head he touched. Lord Shiva went into hiding to escape this threat, resting in various places before coming to the cave at Koteshwar Mahadev. Shiva rested here for some time, meditating, before confronting and defeating the demon. A similar legend is associated with Shrikhand Mahadev and Kinner Kailash in Himachal Pradesh.

Hospital
A modern 60-bed hospital is attached to the temple and serves the local population. This hospital is managed by the Jyotishpeethadheeshwar Jagatguru Shankracharya Swamy Madhavashram Charitable Trust.

References

Hindu temples in Uttarakhand
Rudraprayag district
Shiva temples in Uttarakhand